The 1916 United States Senate election in Wyoming took place on November 7, 1916. Incumbent Senator Clarence D. Clark, a Republican, sought re-election in his first popular election. He was opposed by John B. Kendrick, the incumbent Governor of Wyoming and the Democratic nominee. Owing in part to President Woodrow Wilson's strong performance in the presidential election that year, Kendrick won a narrow but decisive victory over Clark, winning the first of three terms in the U.S. Senate.

Democratic Primary

Candidates
 John B. Kendrick, Governor of Wyoming

Results

Republican Primary

Candidates
 Clarence D. Clark, incumbent U.S. Senator

Results

General election

Results

References

Wyoming
1916
1916 Wyoming elections